Bałtyk Koszalin is a Polish multi-sports club with football, tennis and athletics sections, based in Koszalin, Pomerania. The football section is technically a separate legal entity from the rest of the club. The name Bałtyk means Baltic, the sea which Koszalin is situated upon its shore.

History
The club was created on 25 February 1946 (4 months older than city rivals Gwardia Koszalin), making use of the small local stadium, which was opened in 1935, mainly focusing on athletics and tennis. The football section of the club was reactivated in 1995. This was due to the efforts of brothers Jan and Zenon Bednarek who transformed the football section into an independent club. The first club president was Jan Bednarek, who served this function until 1997. Then he became the president of the local OZPN in Koszalin and resigned from the leadership. As a result, Zenon Bednarek became president and holds this position to this day.

Youth system
Currently the club KKPN Bałtyk trains about 300 players. The club has 11 teams, including 1 senior. The club has 11 coaches. In terms of youth football for many years it was the most successful academy in the region. The youth groups are run by KOZPN Koszalin, regularly winning the provincial junior league competitions. Currently, athletes who train at the club attend sports classes in the four schools of Koszalin. Classes 4-6 are located in Primary School No. 7, where a UKS Baltic SP7 Koszalin team was created. The club is working with School No. 6 where the sport lessons are organised by Bałtyk. Older students attend sports classes at the local College of Economics (classes 1-3).

Notable players
The academy has produced many players who went on to play in the Ekstraklasa or represented the national team:
Sebastian Mila - runner-up Under-16 European Championships, U-17 World Cup participant in New Zealand, a regular national team player, currently at Śląsk Wrocław
Łukasz Bednarek - Polish representative in multiple age categories U-14 to U-18 (now a referee)
Mateusz Kaźmierczak - representative of the Polish U-15, U-16 and U-17 sides, former Wisła Kraków player. After recovering from a knee injury was a senior player of Bałtyk, also the coach of the youth groups at the club.
Dominik Husejko - a representative of Polish U-15, U-16 and U-17 sides, was a player at Wisła Kraków, currently back at Bałtyk.
Marcin Bednarek - representative of the Polish U-16 side, then a player at SMS Szamotuly and Sokół Pniewy, now a coach at Bałtyk.
Radoslaw Feliński - a representative of Polish U-15, U-16, U-17 and U-18 sides, is currently at the fourth-League Leśnik Manowo, formerly at Motor Lublin
Arkadiusz and Łukasz Mokrzycki - formerly at SMS Szamotuły, and Zagłębie Lubin, now at Mieszko Gniezno
Daniel Chyła - formerly at SMS Szamotuły, Zagłębie Lubin, and currently at Górnik Polkowice
Radoslaw Mikołajczak - SMS Szamotuly, now at Legia Warsaw
Wojciech Pawłowski - Lechia Gdańsk
Kacper Kozłowski - Polish youth and senior international footballer, at Pogoń Szczecin and Brighton.
Sebastian Rudol - Polish youth international and played for numerous Ekstraklasa clubs.
Mateusz Kwiatkowski - played in the Ekstraklasa with Ruch Chorzów.

Honours & Awards
Western-Pomeranian Polish Cup Winners  - 2012/13
Third Place in the Older-Junior National Championship in 2010/11
OZPN Koszalin Gold Badge for sport activism
The Minister of Education's 2nd Degree Award - for educational activities and sports
The title of best youth club in the Koszalin Voivodeship

External links
Official football club page
90minut.pl profile

Sports clubs established in 1946
Association football clubs established in 1946
1946 establishments in Poland
Multi-sport clubs in Poland
Sport in Koszalin
Football clubs in West Pomeranian Voivodeship